Shaunette Renée Wilson (born January 19, 1990) is a Guyanese-born American actress. She is best known for four seasons in the role of Dr. Mina Okafor in the Amy Holden Jones-created Fox series The Resident.
She appeared in Black Panther, Billions, and A Kid Like Jake.

Biography 
Shaunette Renée Wilson was born in Guyana and raised in New York from the age of two. She is the daughter of Deberah and Wesley Wilson, and she has three siblings: brother Andre and sisters Serena and Synique.

Shaunette attended the Yale School of Drama. Her Yale School of Drama credits include: Cardboard Piano, Paradise Lost, The Seagull, and The Children. Shaunette received her BA in Drama and Theater from Queens College.

In 2021, Shaunette joined the cast of the Indiana Jones and the Dial of Destiny.

Filmography

Film

Television

References

External links

1990 births
Living people
20th-century African-American people
20th-century African-American women
21st-century American actresses
21st-century African-American people
21st-century African-American women
American film actresses
American people of Guyanese descent
African-American actresses